The New Zealand Football Championship's 2010–11 season (known as the ASB Premiership  for sponsorship reasons) is the seventh season of the NZFC since its establishment in 2004. The home and away season began on 16 October 2010 with a kickoff between Auckland City FC and Waikato FC. Auckland City and Waitakere United will represent the ASB Premiership in the 2010–11 OFC Champions League after finishing Premiers and Champions respectively in the 2009–10 competition.

Clubs
As in the previous season, eight clubs participated in the league.

Stadia and locations

League table

Regular season

Round 1

Round 2

Round 3

Round 4

Round 5

Round 6

Round 7

Round 8

Round 9

Round 10

Round 11

Round 12

Round 13

Round 14

Round 15

Round 16

Finals

Semi-finals – first leg

Semi-finals – second leg

Final

Scorers
Updated to Round 16.

Own goals
Updated to end of Round 16.

References

External links
 NZFC Website

New Zealand Football Championship seasons
1
New
New